Macke is a surname. Notable people with the surname include:

Andreas Macke (born 1962), German physicist
August Macke (1887–1914), German Expressionist painter
Kenneth A. Macke (1938–2008), chairman and chief executive of the Dayton Hudson Corporation, the forerunner of Target Corporation
Richard C. Macke (born 1938), American naval officer